Frank Zappa Plays the Music of Frank Zappa: A Memorial Tribute is a posthumous album by Frank Zappa.

According to the liner notes, Frank's son Dweezil talked with his father shortly before Frank's death about the songs Frank had written that he would consider to be his "signature" tunes.  These were "Zoot Allures", "Black Napkins" and "Watermelon in Easter Hay". The album compiles the original album versions of these three pieces, along with an alternate, live take of each, and the track "Merely a Blues in A". It was released by the Zappa Family Trust and is only available online from Barfko-Swill—the mail-order section on zappa.com.

This release is similar in style to works such as Guitar, Trance-Fusion, Shut Up 'n Play Yer Guitar and The Guitar World According to Frank Zappa.

The album cover is illustrated by Matt Groening.

Track listing 
All tracks written, composed and arranged by Frank Zappa.

Personnel 
 Frank Zappa – lead guitar, vocals
 Norma Bell – vocals
 Napoleon Murphy Brock – tenor saxophone, vocals
 Adrian Belew – rhythm guitar
 Warren Cuccurullo – rhythm guitar
 George Duke – keyboards, vocals
 André Lewis – keyboards, vocals
 Tommy Mars – keyboards
 Peter Wolf – keyboards
 Arthur Barrow – bass
 Roy Estrada – bass, vocals
 Tom Fowler – bass
 Patrick O'Hearn – bass
 Dave Parlato – bass
 Terry Bozzio – drums
 Vinnie Colaiuta – drums-optometric abandon
 Chester Thompson – drums
 Ed Mann – percussion
 Ruth Underwood – marimba
 Lou Anne Neill – harp

References

External links 
 Lyrics and details
 Release details

1996 greatest hits albums
Compilation albums published posthumously
Frank Zappa compilation albums
Barking Pumpkin Records albums
Albums with cover art by Matt Groening